Bani Al-Othmanyan is a sub-district located in al-Saddah District, Ibb Governorate, Yemen. Bani Al-Othmanyan had a population of 3893 according to the 2004 census.

References 

Sub-districts in As Saddah District